Sheridan Tongue is an EMMY-winning and BAFTA-nominated television and film music composer from Belfast, Northern Ireland. He has written and produced soundtracks for many television series including the BBC's Wonders of the Universe and Wonders of the Solar System, Silent Witness (Series 9 – 20), Into The Universe with Stephen Hawking],.   Sheridan Tongue's score for Spooks (Series 3), achieved a BAFTA Television Craft nomination for Best Original Television Music.

Sheridan composed all the music for all five seasons of ITV's crime drama 'DCI Banks (Series 1–5)' produced by Left Bank Pictures'.

In 2020 Sheridan Tongue wrote the soundtrack for the BBC series Spotlight On The Troubles: A Secret History, for which he received a Royal Television Society Award NI Nomination for Best Original Music Score.

He has also engineered and mixed records for artists such as Blur, The Verve and received a Gold Record for his work with Beverley Knight

Early career
As a schoolboy he went to the Royal Belfast Academical Institution (RBAI) and the City of Belfast School of Music (CBSM) and enjoyed musical studies before going on to university at Surrey University. He graduated in 1989 with a BMus in Music and Sound Recording from the Tonmeister course at the University of Surrey, Tongue spent several years working in many commercial studios around London as a programmer, engineer, session musician and songwriter for recording artists including Blur, Beverly Knight, The Verve and Jocelyn Brown before setting up as a freelance film and television composer.

Live appearances
Sheridan has spoken at conferences around the world about music composing for television including SXSW.

IN-IS
Writing music under the pseudonym IN-IS, Sheridan has released two critically-acclaimed albums Seven Days and 2068. Hot Press described IN-IS's single Broken Ones feat. Haula as showcasing Sheridan's talent for "sleek electronic production and beautiful construction of sound".

IN-IS: 2068

2068 is the artist’s second IN-IS album was released in October 2020. It explores what the world will look like in fifty years.

Drawing upon Sheridan’s wide range of musical experiences, from orchestral and electronic to folk-influenced global music, IN-IS shows us a much more personal style to the artist and his craft.  2068 unlocks Sheridan’s musical voice from beyond his screen work, as his modern classical sound creates an intimate backdrop for the seven featured artists he introduces to his music for the first time. Written two years ago, it’s eerily apt for the strange times in which we now find ourselves.

Irish folk singer Ailbhe Reddy wrote the lyrics and performs 2068’s first single ‘Daydream’, with Tom Adams, Ává Bowers, Johny Satellitesister, David Gledhill, Haula, and Alev Lenz collaborating with Sheridan on other tracks.

Sheridan Tongue says: “2068 is a very personal project, borne out of my desire as an artist to explore what the world would look like many years from now. Back in 2018, I felt that we were living through such a period of intense growth with all the rapid advances in technology, whilst also becoming painfully aware of the effect our modern lifestyles were having on our planet and our wellbeing.”

Sheridan’s whole approach with 2068 is unconventional, writing his music first with the lyrics inspired by the individual singers and then woven into the tracks, almost like another instrument designed to elevate each piece.

Film and television credits

Film
Shadow Observers
A to Z (Director - Michael Geoghegan)
The Kitchen Child (Director - Angela Carter)

Television drama
DCI Banks series 1 & 2 
The Sparticle Mystery
Silent Witness series 14
Silent Witness series 13
Summerhill
Cinderella
Silent Witness series 12
Sea of Souls
Silent Witness series 11
Dead Clever
Silent Witness series 10
Magnificent 7 (Winner - Monte Carlo Festival 2006 Signis Prize)
Silent Witness series 9
Spooks series 3 (BAFTA nominated)
Redcap series 2
Down to Earth series 1,2 and 3
Sunburn Series 2

Television documentaries
Atlas 4D
Curiosity - Did God Create the Universe?
Into the Universe with Stephen Hawking
Meerkat Manor: Rise Of The Dynasty
Narco Wars
Russian Revolution in Color
Spotlight on The Troubles: A Secret History
Stephen Hawking’s Favorite Places
Stephen Hawking's Grand Design
Who Framed Jesus?
Wonders of the Solar System
Wonders of the Universe
Wounded

Awards
 Winner: EMMY for Best Audio - The Last Artifact - 2021
 Nominee: Music & Sound Awards - Silent Witness - 2014
 Nominee: BAFTA for Best Original Television Music - Spooks - 2005
 Gold Disc: Beverly Knight - Prodigal Sista - 1998

References

External links

Sheridan Tongue - Official Website
Manners McDade Artist Management - Sheridan's Agent

Last.fm - Sheridan Tongue
Soundcloud - Sheridan Tongue

Alumni of the University of Surrey
British film score composers
British male film score composers
Living people
1960s births
Place of birth missing (living people)